His Exalted Highness is a rare hybrid of the title style Highness. It is used as a salutation style only for the Nizams of Hyderabad and Berar conferred by the British Government.

See also
Mir Osman Ali Khan

References

Royal styles
Royal titles
Titles in India
Hyderabad State